Bellevue is a city in Erie, Huron, Seneca, and Sandusky counties in the U.S. state of Ohio, located 61 miles southwest of Cleveland and 45 miles southeast of Toledo. The population was 8,202 at the 2010 census. The National Arbor Day Foundation has designated Bellevue as a Tree City USA.

The Sandusky County portion of Bellevue is part of the Fremont Micropolitan Statistical Area, while the Huron County portion is part of the Norwalk Micropolitan Statistical Area. The small portion of the city that extends into Erie county is part of the Sandusky Micropolitan Statistical Area.

Bellevue was the home of Henry Morrison Flagler when he partnered up with John D. Rockefeller to start Standard Oil. Flagler later went on to build the Florida Overseas Railroad, to Key West, Florida. The property of his former Bellevue residence on Southwest Street is the current location of the Mad River & NKP Railroad Museum.

The city derives its name from James H. Bell, a railroad official.

It was also noted to be the most affordable place to live in Ohio.

Geography
Bellevue is located at  (41.275808, -82.842099).

Demographics

2010 census
As of the census of 2010, there were 8,202 people, 3,296 households, and 2,148 families living in the city. The racial makeup of the city was 96.3% White, 0.6% African American, 0.2% Native American, 0.2% Asian, 0.7% from other races, and 2.0% from two or more races. Hispanic or Latino of any race were 3.2% of the population.

There were 3,296 households, of which 34.5% had children under the age of 18 living with them, 46.9% were married couples living together, 12.9% had a female householder with no husband present, 5.4% had a male householder with no wife present, and 34.8% were non-families. 29.8% of all households were made up of individuals, and 12.5% had someone living alone who was 65 years of age or older. The average household size was 2.45 and the average family size was 3.01.

The median age in the city was 36.5 years. 26% of residents were under the age of 18; 8.5% were between the ages of 18 and 24; 26.6% were from 25 to 44; 24.3% were from 45 to 64; and 14.5% were 65 years of age or older. The gender makeup of the city was 47.9% male and 52.1% female.

2000 census
As of the census of 2000, there were 8,193 people, 3,332 households, and 2,242 families living in the city. The population density was 1,619.8 people per square mile (625.2/km2). There were 3,559 housing units at an average density of 703.6 per square mile (271.6/km2). The racial makeup of the city was 97.77% White, 0.27% African American, 0.15% Native American, 0.27% Asian, 0.82% from other races, and 0.73% from two or more races. Hispanic or Latino of any race were 2.56% of the population.

There were 3,332 households, out of which 32.8% had children under the age of 18 living with them, 53.2% were married couples living together, 10.4% had a female householder with no husband present, and 32.7% were non-families. 27.6% of all households were made up of individuals, and 12.4% had someone living alone who was 65 years of age or older. The average household size was 2.46 and the average family size was 3.01.

In the city the population was spread out, with 26.5% under the age of 18, 8.3% from 18 to 24, 29.1% from 25 to 44, 21.5% from 45 to 64, and 14.6% who were 65 years of age or older. The median age was 36 years. For every 100 females, there were 93.1 males. For every 100 females age 18 and over, there were 88.6 males.

The median income for a household in the city was $88,100, and the median income for a family was $98,173. Males had a median income of $76,601 versus $44,189 for females. The per capita income for the city was $58,932. About 1.3% of families and 2.8% of the population were below the poverty line, including 1.5% of those under age 18 and 1% of those age 65 or over.

Media
Bellevue and the surrounding area was served by a daily newspaper, The Bellevue Gazette.
The Gazette closed in June 2016, and is no longer in operation.

Transportation

Roads
Bellevue is located on U.S. Route 20, which forms East and West Main Street. State Routes 18, 269, and 113 also run through the city.
There is no public transportation, such as passenger buses or taxis. Bellevue is also served by the Ohio Turnpike via U.S. Route 20 and State Route 4.

Railroad
During the first half of the 20th century, Bellevue was a busy railroad hub of the Nickel Plate Road, and it remains today as a hub for the Norfolk Southern Railway, which operates a massive railroad yard in Bellevue. From Bellevue, Norfolk Southern Lines extend northeast to Cleveland, north to Sandusky, northwest to Toledo, west to Fort Wayne, Indiana and south to Columbus. Also, the Wheeling and Lake Erie Railway operates a line from Bellevue that extends east to Pittsburgh, Pennsylvania.

Notable people
 Henry Flagler, Standard Oil tycoon, developer of Eastern Florida and  "Father of Miami"
 Mildred Gillars (A.K.A. Axis Sally), radio personality during World War II, best known for propaganda broadcasts for Nazi Germany
 Arthur F. Gorham, Commander of the 1st Battalion, 505th Parachute Infantry Regiment during World War II; twice awarded the Distinguished Service Cross
 John Greenslade, Vice Admiral and U.S. Commander of the Pacific-Southern Naval Coastal Frontier during World War II
 Daniel M. Harkness, half brother of Henry Flagler and his son William L. Harkness, investors in Standard Oil
 Stephen V. Harkness, invested as a silent partner with Henry Morrison Flagler and oil titan John D. Rockefeller, Sr. in the founding of Standard Oil. Stephen's son Lamon V. Harkness was born in Bellevue and went on to become extremely wealthy from the Harkness investments in Standard Oil
 Benny LaPresta, NFL professional football player
 Amos Northup, automotive designer
 Christi Paul, CNN reporter and anchor
 Bradbury Robinson, threw the first forward pass in American football history
 Brad Snyder, 2003 Mid-American Conference Baseball Player of the Year, NCAA Division I All-American, and outfielder for Chicago Cubs.
 Howard L. Vickery, Rear Admiral, Vice Chairman U.S. Maritime Commission during World War II

National Register of Historic Places
Bellevue and the surrounding countryside are home to three sites listed on the National Register of Historic Places: the Heter Farm, the John Wright Mansion, and the Tremont House.

References

Further reading
 Camp, Mark J.  "Railroad Depots of Northwest Ohio."  Chicago, Arcadia Publishing, 2005. .
 Drown, William.  "Bellevue and Historic Lyme Village (OH)." Chicago: Arcadia Publishing, 2002. .
 Oddo, William.  "Bellevue, a Pictorial History: A Historic Reflection of an Ohio Community."  Genealogy Publishing Services, 2005. .

External links

 City of Bellevue
 Bellevue Chamber of Commerce
 Bellevue City Schools
 Bellevue Public Library

 
Cities in Erie County, Ohio
Cities in Huron County, Ohio
Cities in Sandusky County, Ohio
Cities in Ohio